Engelbert Dörbrandt (born 2 February 1949) is a German judoka. He competed in the men's half-middleweight event at the 1972 Summer Olympics.

References

1949 births
Living people
German male judoka
Olympic judoka of West Germany
Judoka at the 1972 Summer Olympics
Sportspeople from Berlin
20th-century German people